Sefid Khani-ye Sofla (also Romanized as Sefīd Khānī-ye Soflá; also known as Sar Kalak and Sar Koleh) is a village in Zangvan Rural District, Karezan District, Sirvan County, Ilam Province, Iran. At the 2006 census, its population was 102, in 17 families. The village is populated by Kurds.

References 

Populated places in Sirvan County
Kurdish settlements in Ilam Province